He Who Died of Love (Spanish:El que murió de amor) is a 1945 Mexican fantasy comedy film directed by Miguel Morayta. It stars Julián Soler, Luis Aldás, and Hilde Krüger. The film's sets were designed by the art director Luis Moya.

Cast
 Julián Soler as Conde Octavio de Reminsky  
 Luis Aldás as Carlos Verlan  
 Hilde Krüger as Condesa María  
 Amparo Morillo as Elisa  
 Fanny Schiller as Tía Rita  
 Pita Amor as Julia  
 Rosa Castro as Tía de Carlos  
 Jorge Trevino as General Sibelius  
 Conchita Carracedo as Lolita, criada  
 Fernando Cortés as Dr. Aladino Jr. 
 Norma Ancira 
 Alejandro Ciangherotti as Narrator  
 Julio Daneri as Padrino en duelo  
 Ángel Di Stefani as Invitado a recepción 
 José Escanero as Empleado del conde 
 Ana María Hernández as Invitada a recepción  
 Ramón G. Larrea as Médico  
 Héctor Mateos as Padrino de duelo
 Manuel Pozos
 José Ignacio Rocha as Anciano indigente 
 Joaquín Roche as Mayordomo

References

External links
 

1945 films
1940s fantasy comedy films
Films directed by Miguel Morayta
Mexican black-and-white films
Mexican fantasy comedy films
1945 comedy films
Films based on works by Théophile Gautier
1940s Mexican films